Tuff is a type of rock consisting of consolidated volcanic ash ejected from vents during a volcanic eruption.

Tuff may also refer to:

 Calcareous tuff, a sedimentary rock
 Tuff (name)
 Tuff (band), an American musical group
 "Tuff" (instrumental), a 1961 single by Ace Cannon
 Turbo Undercover Fighting Force (T.U.F.F.), the title organization in the cartoon T.U.F.F. Puppy
 Tuff, a fictional character from the anime Kirby: Right Back at Ya!
 'Tuff, an abbreviation for the Pokémon Wigglytuff
 Tuff TV, digital broadcast television network

See also
 TUF (disambiguation)
 Tough (disambiguation)
 Tuft (disambiguation)